The 2018 Jamaican Athletics Championships was the year's national outdoor track and field championships for Jamaica. It was held from 21–24 June at the Independence Park in Kingston, Jamaica. The national junior championships were staged alongside the senior events.

Results

Men

Women

References

Results: Jamaican Senior and Junior Track and Field National Championships 2018. WatchAthletics. Retrieved 2019-07-14.

External links
 Jamaica Athletics Administrative Association website

Jamaican Athletics Championships
Jamaican Athletics Championships
Jamaican Athletics Championships
Jamaican Athletics Championships
Sport in Kingston, Jamaica